A referendum on a federal law on insolvency and debt was held in Switzerland on 17 November 1889. The new law was approved by 52.9% of voters.

Background
The referendum was an optional referendum, which meant that only a majority of the public vote was required for the proposals to be approved, as opposed to a mandatory referendum, which required both a majority of voters and cantons.

Results

References

1889 referendums
1889 in Switzerland
Referendums in Switzerland